Ralph Norman (fl. 1294–1306) was an English Member of Parliament.

He was a Member (MP) of the Parliament of England for Leicester in 1294 and 1306.

References

13th-century births
14th-century deaths
14th-century English people
13th-century English people
People from Leicester
Members of the Parliament of England (pre-1707)